Vir Singh (8 July 1930 – 29 June 2006) was an Indian gymnast. He competed in seven events at the 1952 Summer Olympics.

References

External links
 

1930 births
2006 deaths
Indian male artistic gymnasts
Olympic gymnasts of India
Gymnasts at the 1952 Summer Olympics
Place of birth missing